The first season of the American television series Atlanta premiered on September 6, 2016. The season is produced by RBA, 343 Incorporated, MGMT. Entertainment, and FXP, with Donald Glover, Paul Simms, and Dianne McGunigle, serving as executive producers. Glover serves as creator and wrote four episodes for the season.

The series was given a 10-season order in October 2015 and stars Donald Glover, Brian Tyree Henry, LaKeith Stanfield, and Zazie Beetz. The series follows Earn during his daily life in Atlanta, Georgia, as he tries to redeem himself in the eyes of his ex-girlfriend Van, who is also the mother of his daughter Lottie; as well as his parents and his cousin Alfred, who raps under the stage name "Paper Boi"; and Darius, Alfred's eccentric right-hand man.

The season premiered on September 6, 2016, with a two-episode premiere on FX. The series premiere received 1.08 million viewers with a 0.5 ratings share in the 18–49 demographics. The season ended on November 1, 2016, with an average of 0.88 million viewers. The season received critical acclaim, with critics praising its cast, writing, originality, and social commentary. At the 74th Golden Globe Awards, the season won Best Television Series – Musical or Comedy while Glover won Best Actor in a Television Series - Musical or Comedy. At the 69th Primetime Emmy Awards, the season was nominated for Outstanding Comedy Series, with Glover winning two awards for Lead Actor in a Comedy Series and Directing for a Comedy Series. The latter made Glover the first African-American to win the award. In September 2016, FX renewed the series for a second season.

Cast and characters

Main
 Donald Glover as Earnest "Earn" Marks
 Brian Tyree Henry as Alfred "Paper Boi" Miles
 LaKeith Stanfield as Darius
 Zazie Beetz as Vanessa "Van" Keefer

Recurring 
 Harold House Moore as Swiff

Guest 
 Isiah Whitlock Jr. as Raleigh Marks
 Jane Adams as Janice
 Austin Crute as Justin Bieber
 Lloyd as himself
 Jaleel White as himself

Episodes

Production

Development

The series was announced in August 2013, with Donald Glover set as lead actor, creator, writer and executive producer. The series was offered to many networks but Glover chose FX for its willingness to accommodate his music touring schedule with the development of the series. In December 2014, FX made a pilot order and Paul Simms and Dianne McGunigle joined as executive producers. In October 2015, FX made a 10-episode series order, with plans to release it in 2016. Nick Grad, President of Original Programming for FX Entertainment, commented "Donald Glover is a uniquely talented actor and performer who brings real-life experience to this subject matter. He, along with Paul Simms, has a very honest, sometimes serious, and funny perspective on life, the world of rap music and the city of Atlanta."

Writing
The series is also notable for having an all-black writing staff, which is virtually unheard of in American television. The writer's room consists of Glover himself, his brother Stephen Glover, and members of his rap collective 'Royalty' including Fam Udeorji (Glover's manager), Ibra Ake (Glover's longtime photographer), and Jamal Olori. Stefani Robinson, a writer for Man Seeking Woman, and Taofik Kolade round out the writer's room.

Glover jokingly referred to the series as "Twin Peaks with rappers". Glover, who grew up in Atlanta and also works as a musician, stated that "the city influenced the tone of the show". He also chose the city as "there's an active dialogue of how things should be. The dynamics of the economy play out really well. It informs for a cool environment." He commented on the development of the series, "There's so many screens that have to be filled now, between your television, your computer and your phone, that I think it's the perfect time to make something that I see, a perfect opportunity to combine everything that media is right now." The series makes constant use of the N-word, which Glover defended as "that's how people talk. It's just the way it is. Trying to pretend that people don't talk like that, like I don't, it's kind of silly. I feel like if we ignore that, people would immediately turn on the television and not know what world they're on."

Regarding the series' surrealism, Glover explained "There really isn't a limit to how abstract you can get, as long as you believe it. There has to be a grounded nature to something — if you have something that is grounded on some level, you can go anywhere. You just have to have it so that they’re abiding by their own rules every step of the way."

Casting
When the pilot was ordered, Glover was reported to play Earnest "Earn" Marks, "a college drop-out who taps into his own musical aspirations when his estranged family member finds sudden fame."

In July 2015, Brian Tyree Henry, LaKeith Stanfield and Zazie Beetz joined the series as the remaining cast members. Henry would play Alfred Miles, "Atlanta's hot of the moment rapper who plans to capitalize on the sudden fame as quickly as possible". Stanfield would play Darius, "Alfred's oddly talented right-hand man and musical collaborator". And Beetz would play Van, "a pragmatist caught up in a complicated relationship with Earn (Glover) due to their daughter".

Filming
Filming on the pilot began in July 2015 in Atlanta, with Hiro Murai directing the episode. Murai previously collaborated with Glover on music videos, commenting "It's obviously a different format. Even in the narrative format I've done, we've never had extensive scripted dialogue scenes and whatnot. But it felt like a natural extension of what Donald and I have done in the past. So in that sense it was a really nice, seamless transition."

In August 2016, it was reported that Glover would make his directorial debut, directing the sixth and seventh episode.

Release

Broadcast
In July 2016, FX announced that the season would premiere on September 6, 2016.

Marketing
The first teaser debuted in June 2016, which was heavily inspired by the music video for "Drop" by The Pharcyde. A new second debuted the next month, with music from "Sleepless" by Flume. A full-length trailer was released in August 2016.

Home media release
The season was released on DVD in Region 1 on March 6, 2018.

Reception

Ratings

 Live +7 ratings were not available, so Live +3 ratings have been used instead.

Critical reception
The first season received widespread acclaim from television critics. The review aggregation website Rotten Tomatoes gives the first season an approval rating of 97% based on 74 reviews, with an average rating of 8.60/10. The website's critical consensus reads, "Ambitious and refreshing, Atlanta offers a unique vehicle for star and series creator Donald Glover's eccentric brand of humor — as well as a number of timely, trenchant observations." On Metacritic, the first season has a score of 90 out of 100, based on reviews from 36 critics, indicating "universal acclaim".

David Wiegand of the San Francisco Chronicle gave it a highly positive review, writing: "The scripts for the four episodes made available to critics are as richly nuanced as anything you'll see on TV or, to be sure, in a movie theater. You will not only know these characters after only one episode, you'll be hooked on them, as well. In so many areas, Atlanta sets the bar exceptionally high." Sonia Saraiya of Variety also praised the series, declaring it a "finished, cinematic, and beautiful production that may be one of the best new shows of the fall." Alan Sepinwall praised Glover's creativity, writing, "he wanted a chance to fail, and while not all of Atlanta works yet, it absolutely has that immersive quality Glover was hoping for."

Critics' top ten lists
The season topped many "Best of 2016" lists and was the second most mentioned series of the year.

Awards and nominations

Notes

References

External links 
 
 

Atlanta (TV series)
2016 American television seasons